Black Coffee is the third cover album recorded by American singer Beth Hart and blues rock guitarist Joe Bonamassa, released on January 26, 2018 on J&R Adventures and Mascot Label Group. It follows their 2013 cover album together titled Seesaw.

Track listing

 Note: Track list sources & citations – iTunes "Black Coffee", Secondhand Songs "Black Coffee",

Personnel

Musicians
 Joe Bonamassa – guitar
 Beth Hart – vocals
 Rob McNelley – rhythm guitar
 Michael Rhodes – bass guitar
 Anton Fig – drums, percussion
 Reese Wynans – keyboards
 Paulie Cerra – tenor saxophone, baritone saxophone
 Ron Dzuibla – tenor saxophone, baritone saxophone
 Lee Thornburg – trumpet, trombone
 Jade Macreae – backing vocals
 Juanita Tippins – backing vocals
 Mahalia Barnes – backing vocals

Production
 Kevin Shirley – production
 Rob Katz – engineering
 Bob Ludwig – mastering
 Jaramiah Rios – engineering assistance
 Kevin Luu – engineering assistance
 Roy Weisman – executive production
 Lowell Reynolds – recording
 Ben Rodgers – recording
 Ron Dziubla – recording

Charts

Certifications

References

2018 albums
Beth Hart albums
Joe Bonamassa albums
Covers albums
Collaborative albums